Pararhizobium is a genus of Gram-negative soil bacteria that fix nitrogen. Some species of Pararhizobium form an endosymbiotic nitrogen-fixing association with roots of legumes.

References

Rhizobiaceae
Bacteria genera